The sulphur-bellied warbler (Phylloscopus griseolus) is a species of leaf-warbler found in the Palearctic region (Afghanistan, Kazakhstan, Kyrgyzstan, Mongolia, Russian Federation [Central Asian Russia], Tajikistan and Turkmenistan). It was earlier also known by the name of olivaceous leaf-warbler.

Like other leaf-warblers, it gleans insects from small branches and leaves. It is found in rocky hill and scrub forest habitats.
 
The species is found in small groups and has a tendency to forage low in the vegetation, sometimes even hopping on the ground. It has a single note cheep call.

Gallery

References

sulphur-bellied warbler
sulphur-bellied warbler
sulphur-bellied warbler